Allison Creek is a stream in the U.S. state of South Dakota.

Allison Creek has the name of Curt Allison, a pioneer rancher.

See also
List of rivers of South Dakota

References

Rivers of Harding County, South Dakota
Rivers of South Dakota